Rictus may refer to:
 Risus sardonicus (or rictus grin), a spasm of the facial muscles
 Rictus (bicosoecid), a genus of flagellates
 Rictus Erectus,  a fictional character